The qualification phase of the 2017 Africa U-17 Cup of Nations decided the participating teams of the final tournament. A total of eight teams played in the final tournament, hosted by Gabon.

The draws were conducted during the CAF Executive Committee meeting held on Friday, 5 February 2016 in Kigali, Rwanda.

Participants

Note: Madagascar were originally to qualify automatically as hosts, but had their hosting rights withdrawn and were replaced by Gabon (which played in the qualifiers and were eliminated in the third round).

Format
Qualification ties were played on a home-and-away two-legged basis. If the aggregate score was tied after the second leg, the away goals rule would be applied, and if still level, the penalty shoot-out would be used to determine the winner (no extra time would be played).

The seven winners of the third round qualified for the final tournament.

First round
The first legs are scheduled for 24–26 June 2016, and the second legs are scheduled for 1–3 July 2016.

|}

Ghana advanced after Liberia withdrew.

Benin advanced after Sierra Leone withdrew.

4–4 on aggregate. Algeria won on away goals.

Chad advanced after DR Congo withdrew.

Morocco won 2–1 on aggregate.

Sudan won 16–0 on aggregate.

Kenya advanced after Malawi withdrew.

Tanzania won 9–0 on aggregate.

2–2 on aggregate. Namibia won on away goals.

Mauritius advanced after Lesotho withdrew.

Comoros advanced after Zimbabwe withdrew.

Second round
The first legs are scheduled for 5–7 August 2016, and the second legs are scheduled for 19–21 August 2016.

|}

Ghana won 6–5 on aggregate.

Ivory Coast won 4–2 on aggregate.

Niger won 3–2 on aggregate.

Gabon won 1–0 on aggregate.

Mali advanced after Chad withdrew from the second leg.

Ethiopia won 5–2 on aggregate.

Senegal won 6–4 on aggregate.

2–2 on aggregate. Guinea won 3–2 on penalties.

Sudan won 2–0 on aggregate.

Cameroon won 9–1 on aggregate.

Tanzania won 3–1 on aggregate.

Congo won 5–1 on aggregate.

Angola won 4–0 on aggregate.

Comoros won 5–1 on aggregate.

Third round
The first legs were scheduled for 16–18 September 2016, and the second legs were scheduled for 30 September – 2 October 2016.Winners Qualify for the 2017 Africa U-17 Cup of Nations.

|}

Ghana won 3–1 on aggregate.

Niger won 4–3 on aggregate.

Mali won 4–1 on aggregate.

Guinea won 2–1 on aggregate.

Cameroon won 7–5 on aggregate.

3–3 on aggregate. Congo won on away goals.

Later Congo were disqualified from the main tournament as a player failed to show up magnetic resonance imaging test, and therefore Tanzania are qualified instead.

Angola won 7–0 on aggregate.

References

External links
 12th Edition Of The U-17 Africa Cup Of Nations, Madagascar 2017, CAFonline.com

U-17 Championship qualification
Africa U-17 Cup of Nations qualification
Qualification
2017